Admiral Fokin was the second ship of the Soviet Navy Project 58 Groznyy-class Guided Missile Cruisers (RKR), also known as the Kynda Class. Launched on 19 November 1961, the vessel served with the Russian Pacific Fleet from the latter half of the 1960s through the 1980s. It undertook a tour of the Indian Ocean, which included visits to foreign ports. Admiral Fokin was transferred to the Russian Navy after the dissolution of the Soviet Union, but was decommissioned on 30 June 1993 and scrapped.

Design
Power was provided by two  TV-12 steam turbines, fuelled by four KVN-95/64 boilers and driving two fixed pitch screws.

The ship was designed for anti-ship warfare around two quadruple SM-70 P-35 launchers for sixteen 4K44 missiles (NATO reporting name SS-N-3 'Shaddock’). To defend against aircraft, the ship was equipped with a single twin ZIF-102 M-1 Volna launcher with sixteen V-600 4K90 (SA-N-1 ‘Goa’) missiles forward and two twin  guns aft, backed up by two single  guns. Defence against submarines was provided by two triple  torpedoes and a pair of RBU-6000  anti-submarine rocket launchers.

In 1975, the missiles were updated and the main radar was upgraded to MR-310A. In 1980, two Uspekh-U radars were added to the ship.

Service
It Launched on 19 November 1961 with the name Steregushyy. ( –vigilant) The vessel was renamed Vladivostok ( – ruler of the east) on 31 October 1962 and eventually received its definitive name of Admiral Fokin on 11 May 1964. The vessel was named after Admiral Vitaliy Alekseyevich Fokin.

Admiral Fokin sailed in 1965 from Severomorsk to Vladivostok to serve with the 175th Missile Ship Brigade in the Pacific Fleet. During the 1960s, the vessel toured the Indian Ocean, visiting Mombasa, Kenya (26 November to 2 December 1968), Aden, South Yemen (2 to 7 January 1969), Al Hudaydah, North Yemen (9 to 12 January 1969), Mumbai, India (February 1969), Nairobi, Kenya (5 to 9 April 1969) and Port Louis, Mauritius (19 April to 23 April 1969). In February and March 1979, Admiral Fokin joined a large fleet of Soviet warships led by Sverdlov-class cruiser  that operated in the South China Sea in support of Vietnam during clashes along their border with China. The vessel continued to serve in the Indian Ocean in the 1980s, returning to South Yemen in May 1980.

At the dissolution of the Soviet Union, Admiral Fokin was decommissioned on 30 June 1993 and scrapped in 1995.

Pennant numbers

References

Ships built at Severnaya Verf
1961 ships
Kynda-class cruisers